Saint-Hilaire-de-Riez is a commune in the Vendée department, administrative region of Pays de la Loire, western France. Saint-Hilaire-de-Riez station has rail connections to Saint-Gilles-Croix-de-Vie and Nantes.

Population

See also
Communes of the Vendée department

References

External links

Official site

Communes of Vendée
Populated coastal places in France